Partha Sarathi Kar  (born 20 December 1973) is a British Indian doctor and Consultant in diabetes and endocrinology at Portsmouth Hospitals NHS Trust. He did his school education in Don Bosco School, Park Circus , Kolkata, India and further did his medical education in Nil Ratan Sircar Medical College and Hospital  

He is National Specialty Advisor for Diabetes with NHS England.

References 

21st-century British medical doctors
British endocrinologists
Living people
Officers of the Order of the British Empire
1973 births